Field hockey at the 2014 Asian Games for women was held in Incheon, South Korea from 22 September to 1 October 2014.

South Korea won the tournament for the fifth time after defeating China 1–0 in the final.

Officials
The following umpires were appointed by the FIH and AHF to officiate the tournament:

 Laurine Delforge (BEL)
 Megan Robertson (CAN)
 Miao Lin (CHN)
 Chen Mei-chen (TPE)
 Claire Adenot (FRA)
 Nirmla Dagar (IND)
 Emi Yamada (JPN)
 Amina Dyussembekova (KAZ)
 Nur Hafizah Azman (MAS)
 Kang Hyun-young (KOR)
 Ornpimol Kittiteerasopon (THA)

Squads

Li Dongxiao
Wang Mengyu
Huang Ting
Xu Xiaoxu
De Jiaojiao
Cui Qiuxia
Wu Mengrong
Xi Xiayun
Peng Yang
Liang Meiyu
Wang Na
Li Hongxia
Zhang Xiaoxue
Sun Xiao
Zhao Yudiao
Song Qingling

Yip Ting Wai
Grace Wong
Tiffany Chan
Janet Ho
Cheung Ka Po
Wong Ching Lung
Kirsten McNeil
Aliya Iqbal Khan
Weeraya Ho
Chan Ching Nam
Ho Yuen Shan
Chan Ka Yee
Mok Ka Man
Lau Pui Sze
Kwok Wing Yan
Yii Sui Suet

Navjot Kaur
Deep Grace Ekka
Monika Malik
Thokchom Chanchan Devi
Savita Punia
Ritu Rani
Poonam Rani
Vandana Kataria
Deepika Thakur
Namita Toppo
Jaspreet Kaur
Sunita Lakra
Sushila Chanu
Rani Rampal
Amandeep Kaur
Lilima Minz

Yuka Yoshikawa
Shiho Sakai
Keiko Manabe
Kana Nomura
Miyuki Nakagawa
Akiko Ota
Shiho Otsuka
Mayumi Ono
Shihori Oikawa
Mazuki Arai
Akane Shibata
Aki Mitsuhashi
Ayaka Nishimura
Yuri Nagai
Hazuki Nagai
Yoshino Kasahara

Guzal Bakhavaddin
Assel Mukasheva
Aizhan Bulebayeva
Natalya Sazontova
Aigerim Makhanova
Gulim Idrissova
Talshyn Bauyrzhanova
Vera Domashneva
Gulnara Imangaliyeva
Guzal Urmanova
Alissa Chepkassova
Irina Dobrioglo
Natalya Gataulina
Olga Sheveleva
Symbat Sabazova
Viktoriya Shaimardanova

Farah Ayuni Yahya
Norhasikin Halim
Nurul Nabihah Mansur
Noor Hasliza
Raja Norsharina
Siti Noor Amarina Ruhaini
Juliani Mohd Din
Norbaini Hashim
Siti Shahida Saad
Norazlin Sumantri
Nadia Abdul Rahman
Nurul Safiqah Mat Isa
Fazilla Sylvester Silin
Siti Noor Hafiza Zainordin
Rabiatul Adawiyah
Nuraini Abdul Rashid

Heo Jae-seong
Kim Hyun-ji
Shin Hye-jeong
An Hyo-ju
Han Hye-lyoung
Park Mi-hyun
Kim Jong-eun
Kim Da-rae
Cho Eun-ji
Seo Jung-eun
Kim Ok-ju
Oh Sun-soon
Park Ki-ju
Jang Soo-ji
Lee Young-sil
Cheon Eun-bi

Jesdaporn Tongsun
Praphatson Khuiklang
Salocha Losakul
Sirikwan Wongkaew
Kanyanut Nakpolkrung
Tikhamporn Sakunpithak
Kanya Jantapet
Chantree Yungyuen
Sukanya Ritngam
Boonta Duangurai
Supansa Samanso
Pawinee Boonkrajang
Anongnat Piresram
Kornkanok Sanpoung
Siraya Yimkrajang
Jongjit Boonmee

Results
All times are Korea Standard Time (UTC+09:00)

Preliminary round

Pool A

Pool B

Classification round

Fifth to eighth place classification

Seventh and eighth place

Fifth and sixth place

First to fourth place classification

Semi-finals

Bronze-medal match

Gold-medal match

Statistics

Final standings

Goalscorers

References

External links
Official website

2014
Women
Asian Games
2014
Asian Games
2014